Ryan Isaac Mendes da Graça (born 8 January 1990) is a Cape Verdean professional footballer who plays as a winger for Al-Nasr and the Cape Verde national team.

He spent most of his club career in France with Le Havre and Lille, and in the UAE Pro League with Sharjah and Al-Nasr. He also had brief spells in England's Championship with Nottingham Forest, and the Turkish Süper Lig with Kayserispor.

Mendes made his senior international debut for Cape Verde in 2010, earning over 50 caps. He represented the nation at the Africa Cup of Nations in 2013, 2015 and 2021.

Club career

Le Havre
Born in Mindelo, São Vicente, Mendes began his career with hometown club Batuque FC. In 2008 he was sold to Le Havre AC, with whom he played his first game in Ligue 1 on 13 May 2009 against AS Saint-Étienne, as a late substitute for Maxime Baca in a 4–2 home loss. He was monitored by Leicester City scout Steve Walsh, who instead signed teammate Riyad Mahrez to the club.

In the 2011–12 Ligue 2, Mendes was joint third top scorer with 13 goals.

Lille
On 1 September 2012, Mendes returned to Ligue 1 on a four-year deal at Lille. He joined for a €3 million fee – the club was in a good financial place after the sale of Eden Hazard to Chelsea – and his monthly salary rose from €7,000 to €120,000. He missed the second half of his first season after having surgery on a right ankle tendon and remained on the sidelines until December 2013. He told the league's website that he was not going to retire despite the injuries.

On 4 September 2015, Mendes joined English side Nottingham Forest on a season-long loan. He scored his first goal for the club twenty days later, opening a 1–1 draw with Huddersfield Town.

Later career
On 31 January 2017, Mendes signed for Kayserispor – ranked 17th in Turkey's Süper Lig – until the summer of 2020. In July 2018, he terminated his deal and moved to Sharjah FC of the UAE Pro League on a three-year deal. He won the league in his first season.

Remaining in the United Arab Emirates, Mendes moved to Al-Nasr SC in Dubai on a two-year contract.

International career
Mendes was a member of the Cape Verde under-21 national team and played formerly with the under-16s an international tournament in Gonfreville-L'Orcher.

He made his debut for the senior team on 11 August 2010, as a 58th-minute substitute for Babanco in a 1–0 friendly loss away to Senegal. His first international goal was scored on 8 October 2011, in a 2–1 loss at Zimbabwe in 2012 Africa Cup of Nations qualification.

In 2013 Africa Cup of Nations qualification, Mendes scored three goals in two wins over Madagascar. At the finals in South Africa, Cape Verde's first major tournament, he played all four games of a run to the quarter-finals.

Mendes scored the decider on 10 September 2014 as Cape Verde won 2–1 against Zambia in Praia, in 2015 Africa Cup of Nations qualification. He was called up for the finals in Equatorial Guinea, playing in all three draws of a group-stage elimination.

In November 2020, he reached 50 international caps, for which he was rewarded with a shirt and plaque the following March. A year later, he was called up for the 2021 Africa Cup of Nations in Cameroon.

Career statistics

Club

International
Scores and results list Cape Verde's goal tally first, score column indicates score after each Mendes goal.

Honours
Sharjah
UAE Pro League: 2018–19

References

External links

1990 births
Living people
People from Mindelo
Cape Verdean footballers
Association football forwards
Cape Verde international footballers
2021 Africa Cup of Nations players
Batuque FC players
Le Havre AC players
Lille OSC players
Nottingham Forest F.C. players
Kayserispor footballers
Sharjah FC players
Al-Nasr SC (Dubai) players
Ligue 2 players
Ligue 1 players
English Football League players
Süper Lig players
UAE Pro League players
2013 Africa Cup of Nations players
Cape Verde under-21 international footballers
2015 Africa Cup of Nations players
Cape Verdean expatriate footballers
Cape Verdean expatriate sportspeople in France
Expatriate footballers in France
Cape Verdean expatriate sportspeople in England
Expatriate footballers in England
Cape Verdean expatriate sportspeople in Turkey
Expatriate footballers in Turkey
Cape Verdean expatriate sportspeople in the United Arab Emirates
Expatriate footballers in the United Arab Emirates